Luka Bajić (born April 25, 2000) is a Croatian professional water polo player. He is currently playing for HAVK Mladost. He is 6 ft 6 in (1.98 m) tall and weighs 216 lb (98 kg).

References

External links

Luka Bajić on Instagram
WPNEWS » Video: Luka Bajic on the Youth WCH
Luka Bajic (CRO) on the FINA Youth WCH and their next opponent Italy

Living people
2000 births
Croatian male water polo players